Merlis Belsher Place is an arena located at the University of Saskatchewan in Saskatoon, Saskatchewan, Canada. It is the current home of the University of Saskatchewan Huskies men and women's hockey teams, as well as the Saskatoon Contacts and Saskatoon Stars of the Saskatoon Minor Hockey Association.

History
In 2016, the University of Saskatchewan announced plans to build a new athletics facility to replace the 90 year-old Rutherford Arena. Originally budgeted to cost $41 million, the University sought to raise the necessary funds through its Home Ice Campaign, which sought donations and fundraising opportunities from alumni, minor hockey associations, and the City of Saskatoon. The arena was named in honour of Merlis Belsher, an alumnus of the University's College of Law, following a donation of $12.25 million to the Campaign.

Construction on the facility officially began on April 28, 2017 with a ground-breaking ceremony. The arena was completed in time for the beginning of the 2018-19 Huskies season, with the women's team hosting the first game in the arena's history on October 5, 2018.

Facilities
Merlis Belsher Place was designed to replace several aging facilities at the University of Saskatchewan. As part of an agreement with the City of Saskatoon, Merlis Belsher Place features two NHL-sized ice surfaces which can be utilized year round and will provide an added 1,500 hours of icetime for minor hockey in the City. The facility also features two NBA-sized basketball courts which will be used as practice space for the University's basketball teams, as well as team rooms for the University's soccer teams and numerous change rooms that are meant to be used by community groups. The basketball courts are named in honour of Ron and Jane Graham, who contributed $4 million to ensure their inclusion in the new arena.

References

External links
 

University of Saskatchewan buildings and structures
Indoor ice hockey venues in Canada
University sports venues in Canada
Buildings and structures in Saskatoon
Sports venues completed in 2018
University and college buildings in Canada
Indoor arenas in Saskatchewan
Sport in Saskatoon
Saskatchewan Huskies
University and college buildings completed in 2018